Rosa Taikon (30 July 1926 – 1 June 2017) was a Swedish Romani silversmith and actress from the Kalderash caste. She was the sister of writer and activist Katarina Taikon.

Her silver jewelry has been exhibited in many galleries and museums such as the National Museum of Fine Arts and Röhsska Museum.

Prizes and awards 
In 2010, she was awarded the Illis quorum medal.

In 2013, she was awarded the Olof Palme Prize for her lifelong struggle for human rights.

Filmography
1953 – Marianne
1950 –The Motor Cavaliers 
1950 – Kyssen på kryssen
1949 – Smeder på luffen

References

Bibliography

Further reading 
 
Rosa Taikon Romsk Silversmed Och Hantverkare by Brita Åsbrink (2014)

External links 
 

1926 births
2017 deaths
Kalderash people
Romani actresses
Swedish Romani people
Swedish silversmiths
Swedish women artisans
Women metalsmiths
20th-century Swedish actresses
Recipients of the Illis quorum
Women jewellers